Gareth Liddle is an English footballer who played in The Football League for Crewe Alexandra. His only appearance for Crewe came in a 3–2 victory over Stockport County during the 1999–2000 season.

External links

 Gareth Liddle released at crewealex.com

English footballers
Crewe Alexandra F.C. players
English Football League players
Living people
Association football midfielders
Year of birth missing (living people)